The International Association of Academies (1899–1913) was an academy designed for the purpose of linking the various Academies around the world, of which the first meeting was held in Paris, France, in 1900. The first president was M. J. de Goeje, a Dutch Orientalist.

See also
 International Council for Science

References

+
Organizations established in 1899
Organizations disestablished in 1913
Supraorganizations